Atrasentan is an experimental drug that is being studied for the treatment of various types of cancer, including non-small cell lung cancer. It is also being investigated as a therapy for diabetic kidney disease.

Atrasentan failed a phase 3 trial for prostate cancer in patients unresponsive to hormone therapy. A second trial confirmed this finding.

It is an endothelin receptor antagonist selective for subtype A (ETA). While other drugs of this type (sitaxentan, ambrisentan) exploit the vasoconstrictive properties of endothelin and are mainly used for the treatment of pulmonary arterial hypertension, atrasentan blocks endothelin induced cell proliferation.

In April 2014, de Zeeuw et al. showed that 0.75 mg and 1.25 mg of atrasentan reduced urinary albumin by 35 and 38% respectively with modest side effects. Patients also had decreased home blood pressures (but no change in office readings) decrease total cholesterol and LDL. Patients in the 1.25 mg dose group had increased weight gain which was presumably due to increased edema and had to withdraw from the study more than the placebo or 0.75 mg dose group. Reductions in proteinuria have been associated with beneficial patient outcomes in diabetic kidney disease with other interventions but is not an accepted end-point by the FDA.

In 2013, SONAR trial was initiated to determine if atrasentan reduces kidney failure in diabetic kidney disease.

References 

Endothelin receptor antagonists
Experimental cancer drugs
Benzodioxoles
Carboxylic acids